The 1928 Duke Blue Devils football team was an American football team that represented Duke University as an independent during the 1928 college football season. In its third season under head coach James DeHart, the team compiled a 5–5 record and outscored opponents by a total of 155 to 116. Roy Hunter was the team captain.

Schedule

References

Duke
Duke Blue Devils football seasons
Duke Blue Devils football